The 2015–16 network television schedule for the four major Brazilian Portuguese commercial broadcast networks in Brazil covers primetime hours from April 2015 to March 2016.

The schedule is followed by a list per network of returning series, new series or telenovelas (soap operas), and series canceled after the 2014–15 season.

Legend

Schedule
 New series are highlighted in bold.
 All times are in Brasília time. Add one hour for Atlantic islands time, subtract one hour for Amazon time and two hours for Acre time.

Sunday

Monday

Tuesday

Wednesday

Thursday

Friday

Saturday

By network

Band

Returning series:
 Agora é Tarde 

New series:
 Masterchef Junior
 Binbir Grace
 Fatmagül

Not returning from 2014–15:
 Sabe ou Não Sabe

Series going into hiatus:
 CQC: Custe o Que Custar

Globo

Returning series:
 The Voice Brasil
 Na Moral
 Amor & Sexo
 Tá no Ar: A TV na TV
 Superstar

New series:
 Chapa Quente
 Tomara Que Caia
 Verdades Secretas
New telenovelas:
 Além do Tempo (July 13)
 A Regra do Jogo (August 31)
 Totalmente Demais (November 2)

Not returning from 2014–15:
 A Grande Família

Record

Returning series:
 Prova de Amor (aired 2005)
 Dona Xepa (aired 2013)
 Chamas da Vida (aired 2009)
 Domingo Show
 Hora do Faro
 Programa da Sabrina
 Legendários

New series:
 Xuxa Meneghel
New telenovelas:
 Os Dez Mandamentos
 Escrava Mãe

Not returning from 2014–15:
 Me Leva Contigo

SBT

Returning series:
 Máquina da Fama
 Cozinha Sob Pressão (Hell's Kitchen)

New series:
 Bake-Off Brasil: Mão na Massa
 Acelerados
 Cúmplices de Um Resgate
 A Dona
 Turismo & Aventura
 Sabadão com Celso Portiolli
 Mundo Disney
 Pequenos Campeões

Not returning from 2014–15:
 Esse Artista Sou Eu
 Supernanny
 Patrulha Salvadora
 Vrum
 Planeta Turismo
 De Frente com Gabi
 Arena SBT
 Menino de Ouro

RedeTV!

New Series:
 Melhor Pra Você
 Sensacional com Daniela Alburquerque
 Chega Mais
 Documento Verdade
 Mariana Godoy Entrevista

Ongoing Shows:
 Encrenca
 A Tarde é Sua
 Mega Senha
 Você na TV
 Super Pop
 Luciana By Night
 Te Peguei
 Te Peguei na TV
 Ritmo Brasil
 Programa Amaury Jr.
 Leitura Dinâmica
 Operação de Risco
 Viagem Cultural
 É Notícia

Not Returning from 2014-15:
 The Bachelor: Em Busca do Grande Amor
 TV Kids
 Teste de Fidelidade

References

Television in Brazil
2015 in Brazilian television
2016 in Brazilian television
Brazilian television schedules